Copycat effect may refer to:
Copycat crimes, crimes inspired by or replicating another crime
Copycat suicide, suicide inspired by or replicating another's suicide

See also 
Copycat (disambiguation)